The Kahn system is an industrial construction technique for reinforcement of buildings that was engineered and patented by Julius Kahn. The Kahn system is an industrial construction design using the Kahn trussed bar as its basis. This steel bar was a new type of reinforcing bar used in concrete and had unique engineered features to distribute stress.

Kahn saw problems with the concrete reinforcement systems used in building construction at the end of the 19th century. The existing technique of construction of the time was using concrete with a plain straight steel in the center of a concrete beam. The steel in the concrete would slip if there was even the tiniest bit of room between the hardened concrete and the steel and it would break adhesion. The main reinforcing bar had plain steel beam members rigidly attached to it. This diagonal tension fractured the reinforcing bar beams since the adhesion was broken. This caused weakness in the concrete/steel reinforced beam and a failure that could cause catastrophic results.

Description
A reinforced beam bar in the early 1900s consisted of a plain straight steel in the center of a molded concrete form. The beam would fail along the lines of principal stresses in the concrete through shearing. The plain straight steel was placed into an encased mold and concrete was poured in. This formulated mixture of steel and concrete then hardened and became the reinforced beam bar. But in some cases there was a tiny air gap between the steel and the hardened concrete which allowed the steel to move and slip. This weakened the reinforced beam from its original full strength capability. This meant then this weakened fractured beam could fail and break under the heavy load of the building it was supporting.

Kahn discovered that concrete was much stronger in compression than tension, so devised the idea of distributing the stresses. He did scientific engineering experiments and created the concept that if the steel beam edges were bent back at a 45-degree angle forming projecting tabs or "wings" before going into the molded form led to better stress distribution. The winged sheared members are cut and turned up to form an angle from the thin edge of the steel bar but are still permanently attached. When the wet concrete mixture was poured and hardened there was no slippage of the steel beam because the tension stress is distributed throughout the beam.

This new style constructed steel beam was called "the Kahn trussed bar", sometimes shortened to just "the Kahn bar". The trussed steel bar had bent-up "wings" on each side. The "wings" on the steel bar provided 20–30% additional strength to a reinforced concrete beam over the old technology of plain straight smooth steel bars or rods. The primary concept of the Kahn bar was that it gave reinforcement in both the vertical and horizontal plane while it simplified construction. The principal lines of shear stresses in a beam average a 45-degree angle, so the angled "wings" transmitted the tension down to the main reinforcing steel beam.

The Kahn bar is of high grade steel with an elastic limit of 42,000 pounds and tensile strength of 70,000 pounds per square inch. Kahn formed his own company in 1903 called Trussed Concrete Steel Company (aka "Truscon Steel Company") located in Youngstown, Ohio, to manufacture these special steel bars used in reinforced concrete beams.

Another new engineered innovation of Kahn was steel forms built with "ribs" instead of "wings". It was a derivative from Kahn's 1903 patent. This advanced technology was marketed by the Trussed Concrete Steel Company with the brand name of Hy-Rib products. The Kahn system of reinforced concrete is the first time an automobile factory was constructed; it was for Packard automobile factory plant building number 10 designed in 1903–05. The Kahn system of reinforcement products had been used in over 1500 buildings in the United States by 1907.

Kahn trussed bar applications
Kahn's patented invention is a steel bar of 45-degree diagonal "wings" as several minor members that are rigidly attached to the main member. The idea of the "wing" technique is that the stresses are distributed throughout the main reinforced beam. The steel then doesn't slip within the hardened concrete.

Another significant feature of the Kahn trussed bar and Kahn system of reinforced concrete was its resistance to fire.

See also

 Albert Kahn Associates
 Hy-Rib
 Manistee Watch Company
 Truscon Laboratories
 Trussed Concrete Steel Company

References

Bibliography

Further reading
 Siri, Joseph."The Architecture of Earthquake Resistance: Julius Kahn's Truscon Company and Frank Lloyd Wright's Imperial Hotel." J. Soc. Of Archit. Hist., March 2008. pp PP. 78–105.
 Structurae. "Robert Maillart." International Database and gallery of Structures. Web. April 20, 2013
 TRUSCON. "TRUSCON: The First Fifty Years, 1907–1957." April 1957.
 Trussed Concrete Steel Co. "Kahn Building Products." 1913.
 Trussed Concrete Steel Co. "Kahn System of Reinforced Concrete." June. 20, 1904.
 Trussed Concrete Steel Co. "United Steel Sash." 1912.

External links

 Kahn system of reinforced concrete
 Concrete and metal construction, patent # US736602 A
 Albert Kahn and his "Kahn-crete": The Revolutionization of Factory Architecture
 Video on "Engineering Industrial Architecture: Albert Kahn and the Trussed Concrete Steel Company"
 Michigan Historical Collections, Bentley Historical Library, University of Michigan, Albert Kahn Papers, 1896–2011

Composite materials
Concrete
Structural engineering
American inventions